The 1996 Chicago White Sox season was the White Sox's 97th season. They finished with a record of 85-77, good enough for 2nd place in the American League Central, 14.5 games behind the 1st place Cleveland Indians.

Offseason 
 December 28, 1995: Tim Raines was traded by the Chicago White Sox to the New York Yankees for a player to be named later. The New York Yankees sent Blaise Kozeniewski (minors) (February 6, 1996) to the Chicago White Sox to complete the trade.
 January 20, 1996: Tony Phillips was signed as a free agent with the Chicago White Sox.
 January 22, 1996: Danny Tartabull was traded by the Oakland Athletics to the Chicago White Sox for Andrew Lorraine and Charles Poe (minors).

Regular season

Season standings

Record vs. opponents

Game log 

|- bgcolor="ffbbbb"
| 1 || March 31 || @ Mariners || 2–3 (12) || Hurtado || Simas (0–1) || — || 57,467 || 0–1
|-

|- bgcolor="ffbbbb"
| 2 || April 2 || @ Mariners || 2–3 || Hitchcock || Alvarez (0–1) || Charlton || 38,570 || 0–2
|- bgcolor="ccffcc"
| 3 || April 3 || @ Mariners || 4–2 || Magrane (1–0) || Wolcott || Hernandez (1) || 22,783 || 1–2
|- bgcolor="ffbbbb"
| 4 || April 5 || @ Angels || 6–7 (11) || James || McCaskill (0–1) || — || 22,812 || 1–3
|- bgcolor="ccffcc"
| 5 || April 6 || @ Angels || 8–4 || Fernandez (1–0) || Abbott || — || 26,447 || 2–3
|- bgcolor="ffbbbb"
| 6 || April 7 || @ Angels || 5–6 || Finley || Alvarez (0–2) || Percival || 16,970 || 2–4
|- bgcolor="ffbbbb"
| 7 || April 9 || Rangers || 2–3 || Gross || Thomas (0–1) || Henneman || 34,750 || 2–5
|- bgcolor="ccffcc"
| 8 || April 11 || Rangers || 8–5 (11) || Thomas (1–1) || Henneman || — || 16,685 || 3–5
|- bgcolor="ffbbbb"
| 9 || April 12 || Athletics || 2–7 || Reyes || Fernandez (1–1) || — || 13,623 || 3–6
|- bgcolor="ccffcc"
| 10 || April 13 || Athletics || 6–5 (12) || Karchner (1–0) || Wengert || — || 15,812 || 4–6
|- bgcolor="ffbbbb"
| 11 || April 14 || Athletics || 5–10 || Groom || Simas (0–2) || — || 15,236 || 4–7
|- bgcolor="ccffcc"
| 12 || April 15 || @ Royals || 11–10 || Karchner (2–0) || Pichardo || Hernandez (2) || 12,653 || 5–7
|- bgcolor="ffbbbb"
| 13 || April 16 || @ Royals || 5–6 || Belcher || Bere (0–1) || Montgomery || 12,399 || 5–8
|- bgcolor="ccffcc"
| 14 || April 17 || @ Royals || 3–1 || Fernandez (2–1) || Appier || Hernandez (3) || 13,350 || 6–8
|- bgcolor="ccffcc"
| 15 || April 19 || @ Athletics || 4–3 || Karchner (3–0) || Briscoe || Hernandez (4) || 31,320 || 7–8
|- bgcolor="ccffcc"
| 16 || April 20 || @ Athletics || 8–3 || Tapani (1–0) || Van Poppel || — || 16,480 || 8–8
|- bgcolor="ffbbbb"
| 17 || April 21 || @ Athletics || 5–6 || Corsi || Simas (0–3) || Mohler || 16,125 || 8–9
|- bgcolor="ccffcc"
| 18 || April 22 || @ Rangers || 12–4 || Fernandez (3–1) || Witt || Karchner (1) || 22,348 || 9–9
|- bgcolor="ccffcc"
| 19 || April 23 || @ Rangers || 6–5 || Baldwin (1–0) || Hill || Hernandez (5) || 29,123 || 10–9
|- bgcolor="ccffcc"
| 20 || April 24 || Mariners || 2–1 || Alvarez (1–2) || Bosio || Hernandez (6) || 15,882 || 11–9
|- bgcolor="ccffcc"
| 21 || April 25 || Mariners || 4–3 || Tapani (2–0) || Wolcott || Hernandez (7) || 14,679 || 12–9
|- bgcolor="ccffcc"
| 22 || April 27 || Angels || 2–1 || Fernandez (4–1) || Abbott || Hernandez (8) || 18,139 || 13–9
|- bgcolor="ccffcc"
| 23 || April 28 || Angels || 10–1 || Baldwin (2–0) || Finley || — || 15,574 || 14–9
|- bgcolor="ccffcc"
| 24 || April 29 || Angels || 4–3 || Alvarez (2–2) || Grimsley || Hernandez (9) || 12,549 || 15–9
|- bgcolor="ffbbbb"
| 25 || April 30 || @ Indians || 3–5 || Martinez || Tapani (2–1) || Mesa || 40,268 || 15–10
|-

|- bgcolor="ffbbbb"
| 26 || May 1 || @ Indians || 5–9 || McDowell || McCaskill (0–2) || Plunk || 40,447 || 15–11
|- bgcolor="ffbbbb"
| 27 || May 2 || @ Yankees || 1–5 || Cone || Fernandez (4–2) || — || 19,773 || 15–12
|- bgcolor="ffbbbb"
| 28 || May 3 || @ Yankees || 0–2 || Rivera || Thomas (1–2) || Wetteland || 15,599 || 15–13
|- bgcolor="ccffcc"
| 29 || May 4 || @ Yankees || 11–5 || Karchner (4–0) || Nelson || — || 20,661 || 16–13
|- bgcolor="ffbbbb"
| 30 || May 5 || @ Yankees || 1–7 || Pettitte || Tapani (2–2) || — || 26,525 || 16–14
|- bgcolor="ccffcc"
| 31 || May 7 || Orioles || 3–2 || Fernandez (5–2) || Wells || Hernandez (10) || 16,130 || 17–14
|- bgcolor="ccffcc"
| 32 || May 8 || Orioles || 11–2 || Baldwin (3–0) || Erickson || — || 14,974 || 18–14
|- bgcolor="ffbbbb"
| 33 || May 9 || Orioles || 4–6 || Mussina || Alvarez (2–3) || Myers || 14,507 || 18–15
|- bgcolor="ccffcc"
| 34 || May 10 || Yankees || 5–2 || Tapani (3–2) || Pettitte || Hernandez (11) || 15,784 || 19–15
|- bgcolor="ccffcc"
| 35 || May 11 || Yankees || 7–5 || McCaskill (1–2) || Wetteland || — || 25,722 || 20–15
|- bgcolor="ffbbbb"
| 36 || May 12 || Yankees || 8–9 || Wickman || Thomas (1–3) || Wetteland || 17,405 || 20–16
|- bgcolor="ffbbbb"
| 37 || May 13 || @ Brewers || 2–6 || Sparks || Baldwin (3–1) || Boze || 9,544 || 20–17
|- bgcolor="ccffcc"
| 38 || May 15 || @ Brewers || 20–8 || Alvarez (3–3) || Bones || Keyser (1) || 8,733 || 21–17
|- bgcolor="ffbbbb"
| 39 || May 16 || @ Brewers || 2–3 || Lloyd || Tapani (3–3) || Fetters || 13,849 || 21–18
|- bgcolor="ccffcc"
| 40 || May 17 || @ Tigers || 11–6 (10) || Hernandez (1–0) || Lewis || — || 12,094 || 22–18
|- bgcolor="ccffcc"
| 41 || May 18 || @ Tigers || 16–4 || McCaskill (2–2) || Farrell || Simas (1) || 21,673 || 23–18
|- bgcolor="ccffcc"
| 42 || May 19 || @ Tigers || 14–3 || Alvarez (4–3) || Gohr || — || 9,709 || 24–18
|- bgcolor="ccffcc"
| 43 || May 21 || Blue Jays || 2–1 || Tapani (4–3) || Ware || Hernandez (12) || 17,483 || 25–18
|- bgcolor="ccffcc"
| 44 || May 22 || Blue Jays || 2–1 (11) || McCaskill (3–2) || Timlin || — || 17,882 || 26–18
|- bgcolor="ccffcc"
| 45 || May 24 || Brewers || 4–3 || Thomas (2–3) || Sparks || Hernandez (13) || 18,346 || 27–18
|- bgcolor="ccffcc"
| 46 || May 25 || Brewers || 9–7 || Alvarez (5–3) || Bones || Hernandez (14) || 20,585 || 28–18
|- bgcolor="ccffcc"
| 47 || May 26 || Brewers || 12–1 || Tapani (5–3) || McDonald || — || 21,151 || 29–18
|- bgcolor="ffbbbb"
| 48 || May 27 || @ Blue Jays || 4–5 || Janzen || Fernandez (5–3) || Timlin || 30,013 || 29–19
|- bgcolor="ccffcc"
| 49 || May 28 || @ Blue Jays || 8–5 || Baldwin (4–1) || Viola || Hernandez (15) || 30,104 || 30–19
|- bgcolor="ffbbbb"
| 50 || May 29 || @ Blue Jays || 5–6 || Hanson || Magrane (1–1) || Timlin || 31,074 || 30–20
|- bgcolor="ccffcc"
| 51 || May 30 || Tigers || 8–2 || Alvarez (6–3) || Olivares || — || 17,339 || 31–20
|- bgcolor="ccffcc"
| 52 || May 31 || Tigers || 9–0 || Tapani (6–3) || Lira || — || 16,983 || 32–20
|-

|- bgcolor="ccffcc"
| 53 || June 2 || Tigers || 4–2 || Baldwin (5–1) || Thompson || Hernandez (16) || — || 33–20
|- bgcolor="ccffcc"
| 54 || June 2 || Tigers || 13–5 || McCaskill (4–2) || Keagle || — || 26,125 || 34–20
|- bgcolor="ccffcc"
| 55 || June 4 || @ Red Sox || 6–4 || Alvarez (7–3) || Gunderson || Hernandez (17) || 23,715 || 35–20
|- bgcolor="ccffcc"
| 56 || June 5 || @ Red Sox || 8–6 (12) || Keyser (1–0) || Slocumb || — || 24,246 || 36–20
|- bgcolor="ffbbbb"
| 57 || June 6 || @ Red Sox || 4–7 || Eshelman || Magrane (1–2) || Stanton || 24,382 || 36–21
|- bgcolor="ccffcc"
| 58 || June 7 || @ Orioles || 8–2 || Fernandez (6–3) || Erickson || — || 47,209 || 37–21
|- bgcolor="ccffcc"
| 59 || June 8 || @ Orioles || 2–1 || Baldwin (6–1) || Mercker || Hernandez (18) || 47,634 || 38–21
|- bgcolor="ccffcc"
| 60 || June 9 || @ Orioles || 12–9 || Karchner (5–0) || Mussina || Hernandez (19) || 47,352 || 39–21
|- bgcolor="ccffcc"
| 61 || June 10 || Red Sox || 8–2 || Tapani (7–3) || Wakefield || — || 21,799 || 40–21
|- bgcolor="ffbbbb"
| 62 || June 11 || Red Sox || 2–9 || Eshelman || Magrane (1–3) || — || 20,792 || 40–22
|- bgcolor="ffbbbb"
| 63 || June 12 || Red Sox || 2–3 (12) || Hudson || Karchner (5–1) || — || 21,139 || 40–23
|- bgcolor="ccffcc"
| 64 || June 14 || @ Mariners || 4–1 || Alvarez (8–3) || Hitchcock || Hernandez (20) || 30,163 || 41–23
|- bgcolor="ffbbbb"
| 65 || June 15 || @ Mariners || 6–8 (12) || Carmona || McCaskill (4–3) || — || 47,042 || 41–24
|- bgcolor="ffbbbb"
| 66 || June 16 || @ Mariners || 6–7 || Wells || Magrane (1–4) || Jackson || 34,588 || 41–25
|- bgcolor="ffbbbb"
| 67 || June 17 || @ Angels || 8–9 (13) || Hancock || McCaskill (4–4) || — || 17,836 || 41–26
|- bgcolor="ffbbbb"
| 68 || June 18 || @ Angels || 4–5 || Finley || Simas (0–4) || Percival || 19,213 || 41–27
|- bgcolor="ffbbbb"
| 69 || June 19 || @ Angels || 2–14 || McElroy || Alvarez (8–4) || — || 22,960 || 41–28
|- bgcolor="ffbbbb"
| 70 || June 20 || Mariners || 5–8 || Hitchcock || Tapani (7–4) || Charlton || 23,017 || 41–29
|- bgcolor="ffbbbb"
| 71 || June 21 || Mariners || 2–12 || Wagner || Magrane (1–5) || — || 23,253 || 41–30
|- bgcolor="ffbbbb"
| 72 || June 22 || Mariners || 2–4 || Wells || Fernandez (6–4) || Charlton || 27,036 || 41–31
|- bgcolor="ccffcc"
| 73 || June 23 || Mariners || 7–6 (10) || McCaskill (5–4) || Guetterman || — || 26,768 || 42–31
|- bgcolor="ccffcc"
| 74 || June 24 || Angels || 4–2 || Alvarez (9–4) || James || Hernandez (21) || — || 43–31
|- bgcolor="ffbbbb"
| 75 || June 24 || Angels || 4–6 || Hancock || Sirotka (0–1) || Percival || 24,469 || 43–32
|- bgcolor="ccffcc"
| 76 || June 25 || Angels || 3–2 || Tapani (8–4) || Langston || Hernandez (22) || 23,270 || 44–32
|- bgcolor="ccffcc"
| 77 || June 27 || Indians || 15–10 || Fernandez (7–4) || Swindell || — || 27,782 || 45–32
|- bgcolor="ccffcc"
| 78 || June 28 || Indians || 4–2 || Baldwin (7–1) || Tavarez || Hernandez (23) || 33,136 || 46–32
|- bgcolor="ffbbbb"
| 79 || June 29 || Indians || 2–3 (10) || Shuey || Karchner (5–2) || — || 43,601 || 46–33
|- bgcolor="ffbbbb"
| 80 || June 30 || Indians || 2–4 || Hershiser || Tapani (8–5) || Mesa || 30,351 || 46–34
|-

|- bgcolor="ffbbbb"
| 81 || July 1 || Twins || 7–10 || Aguilera || Sirotka (0–2) || — || 19,211 || 46–35
|- bgcolor="ccffcc"
| 82 || July 2 || Twins || 7–4 || Fernandez (8–4) || Aldred || Hernandez (24) || 18,357 || 47–35
|- bgcolor="ffbbbb"
| 83 || July 3 || Twins || 5–6 || Radke || Andujar (0–1) || Stevens || 26,113 || 47–36
|- bgcolor="ccffcc"
| 84 || July 4 || @ Indians || 6–5 (10) || Karchner (6–2) || Mesa || Hernandez (25) || 42,355 || 48–36
|- bgcolor="ccffcc"
| 85 || July 5 || @ Indians || 7–0 || Alvarez (10–4) || Hershiser || — || 42,536 || 49–36
|- bgcolor="ccffcc"
| 86 || July 6 || @ Indians || 3–2 || Karchner (7–2) || Shuey || Hernandez (26) || 42,454 || 50–36
|- bgcolor="ffbbbb"
| 87 || July 7 || @ Indians || 1–6 || Ogea || Fernandez (8–5) || Assenmacher || 42,343 || 50–37
|- bgcolor="ffbbbb"
| 88 || July 11 || @ Royals || 2–3 || Haney || Alvarez (10–5) || — || 22,928 || 50–38
|- bgcolor="ccffcc"
| 89 || July 12 || @ Royals || 7–6 || Tapani (9–5) || Belcher || Hernandez (27) || 18,458 || 51–38
|- bgcolor="ccffcc"
| 90 || July 13 || @ Royals || 3–1 || Fernandez (9–5) || Rosado || — || 25,363 || 52–38
|- bgcolor="ccffcc"
| 91 || July 14 || @ Royals || 3–2 || Baldwin (8–1) || Linton || Hernandez (28) || 17,024 || 53–38
|- bgcolor="ffbbbb"
| 92 || July 15 || @ Twins || 5–16 || Aldred || McCaskill (5–5) || — || 13,636 || 53–39
|- bgcolor="ccffcc"
| 93 || July 16 || @ Twins || 11–2 || Alvarez (11–5) || Radke || — || 18,502 || 54–39
|- bgcolor="ffbbbb"
| 94 || July 17 || @ Twins || 3–4 || Trombley || Simas (0–5) || — || 20,755 || 54–40
|- bgcolor="ffbbbb"
| 95 || July 18 || Royals || 1–7 || Appier || Fernandez (9–6) || Pichardo || 17,657 || 54–41
|- bgcolor="ffbbbb"
| 96 || July 19 || Royals || 4–7 (10) || Montgomery || Hernandez (1–1) || — || 19,604 || 54–42
|- bgcolor="ffbbbb"
| 97 || July 20 || Royals || 5–7 || Linton || Keyser (1–1) || Montgomery || 32,282 || 54–43
|- bgcolor="ccffcc"
| 98 || July 21 || Royals || 6–3 || Alvarez (12–5) || Haney || Hernandez (29) || 21,253 || 55–43
|- bgcolor="ffbbbb"
| 99 || July 22 || Athletics || 5–6 || Taylor || Karchner (7–3) || — || 23,572 || 55–44
|- bgcolor="ffbbbb"
| 100 || July 23 || Athletics || 4–8 || Wengert || Fernandez (9–7) || Corsi || 18,527 || 55–45
|- bgcolor="ffbbbb"
| 101 || July 24 || Athletics || 5–6 || Corsi || Simas (0–6) || Taylor || 23,350 || 55–46
|- bgcolor="ffbbbb"
| 102 || July 25 || Rangers || 3–4 (12) || Russell || Keyser (1–2) || Henneman || 19,524 || 55–47
|- bgcolor="ccffcc"
| 103 || July 26 || Rangers || 6–2 || Alvarez (13–5) || Oliver || — || 21,398 || 56–47
|- bgcolor="ffbbbb"
| 104 || July 27 || Rangers || 4–6 (10) || Heredia || Simas (0–7) || Vosberg || 22,629 || 56–48
|- bgcolor="ccffcc"
| 105 || July 28 || Rangers || 5–1 || Fernandez (10–7) || Pavlik || — || 20,902 || 57–48
|- bgcolor="ccffcc"
| 106 || July 30 || @ Athletics || 2–1 || Baldwin (9–1) || Telgheder || Hernandez (30) || 14,210 || 58–48
|- bgcolor="ffbbbb"
| 107 || July 31 || @ Athletics || 4–5 || Witasick || Karchner (7–4) || Taylor || 13,127 || 58–49
|-

|- bgcolor="ccffcc"
| 108 || August 1 || @ Athletics || 8–3 || Tapani (10–5) || Wasdin || Hernandez (31) || 10,514 || 59–49
|- bgcolor="ccffcc"
| 109 || August 2 || @ Rangers || 9–0 || Fernandez (11–7) || Pavlik || — || 36,299 || 60–49
|- bgcolor="ccffcc"
| 110 || August 3 || @ Rangers || 11–9 || Hernandez (2–1) || Russell || — || 46,481 || 61–49
|- bgcolor="ffbbbb"
| 111 || August 4 || @ Rangers || 5–9 || Witt || Baldwin (9–2) || — || 32,854 || 61–50
|- bgcolor="ccffcc"
| 112 || August 5 || @ Rangers || 15–5 || Alvarez (14–5) || Oliver || — || 29,973 || 62–50
|- bgcolor="ffbbbb"
| 113 || August 6 || @ Yankees || 2–9 || Rogers || Tapani (10–6) || — || 33,025 || 62–51
|- bgcolor="ccffcc"
| 114 || August 7 || @ Yankees || 8–4 (10) || Hernandez (3–1) || Nelson || — || 31,098 || 63–51
|- bgcolor="ffbbbb"
| 115 || August 8 || @ Yankees || 4–8 || Wickman || Andujar (0–2) || Rivera || 35,898 || 63–52
|- bgcolor="ccffcc"
| 116 || August 9 || Orioles || 4–3 (10) || Simas (1–7) || Myers || — || 23,995 || 64–52
|- bgcolor="ffbbbb"
| 117 || August 10 || Orioles || 4–13 || Mussina || Alvarez (14–6) || McDowell || 26,772 || 64–53
|- bgcolor="ccffcc"
| 118 || August 11 || Orioles || 8–5 || Tapani (11–6) || Mills || Hernandez (32) || 27,088 || 65–53
|- bgcolor="ccffcc"
| 119 || August 12 || Yankees || 3–2 (10) || Hernandez (4–1) || Wetteland || — || 32,492 || 66–53
|- bgcolor="ccffcc"
| 120 || August 13 || Yankees || 8–4 || Bertotti (1–0) || Weathers || — || 26,455 || 67–53
|- bgcolor="ffbbbb"
| 121 || August 14 || Yankees || 1–3 || Pettitte || Baldwin (9–3) || Rivera || 23,350 || 67–54
|- bgcolor="ffbbbb"
| 122 || August 16 || @ Brewers || 7–9 || Miranda || Levine (0–1) || Villone || — || 67–55
|- bgcolor="ffbbbb"
| 123 || August 16 || @ Brewers || 2–3 || Van Egmond || Tapani (11–7) || Fetters || 25,529 || 67–56
|- bgcolor="ccffcc"
| 124 || August 17 || @ Brewers || 6–2 || Fernandez (12–7) || McDonald || Hernandez (33) || 31,551 || 68–56
|- bgcolor="ffbbbb"
| 125 || August 18 || @ Brewers || 7–8 || Miranda || Darwin (0–1) || Fetters || 33,094 || 68–57
|- bgcolor="ccffcc"
| 126 || August 19 || @ Tigers || 12–7 || Simas (2–7) || Lima || — || 14,690 || 69–57
|- bgcolor="ffbbbb"
| 127 || August 20 || @ Tigers || 11–16 || Lewis || Tapani (11–8) || — || 12,119 || 69–58
|- bgcolor="ffbbbb"
| 128 || August 21 || @ Tigers || 4–7 || Lima || Simas (2–8) || Olson || 13,424 || 69–59
|- bgcolor="ffbbbb"
| 129 || August 22 || Blue Jays || 0–1 (6) || Hanson || Fernandez (12–8) || — || 22,394 || 69–60
|- bgcolor="ffbbbb"
| 130 || August 23 || Blue Jays || 2–4 || Hentgen || Ruffcorn (0–1) || — || 19,132 || 69–61
|- bgcolor="ffbbbb"
| 131 || August 24 || Blue Jays || 2–9 || Williams || Baldwin (9–4) || — || 29,413 || 69–62
|- bgcolor="ccffcc"
| 132 || August 25 || Blue Jays || 10–9 (10) || Hernandez (5–1) || Timlin || — || 19,647 || 70–62
|- bgcolor="ffbbbb"
| 133 || August 26 || Brewers || 2–3 || Eldred || Alvarez (14–7) || Jones || 19,637 || 70–63
|- bgcolor="ffbbbb"
| 134 || August 27 || Brewers || 2–4 || Van Egmond || Fernandez (12–9) || Fetters || 15,443 || 70–64
|- bgcolor="ccffcc"
| 135 || August 28 || Brewers || 2–0 || Baldwin (10–4) || McDonald || Hernandez (34) || 17,269 || 71–64
|- bgcolor="ccffcc"
| 136 || August 30 || @ Blue Jays || 11–2 || Tapani (12–8) || Williams || — || 30,072 || 72–64
|- bgcolor="ccffcc"
| 137 || August 31 || @ Blue Jays || 5–1 || Alvarez (15–7) || Flener || — || 32,141 || 73–64
|-

|- bgcolor="ccffcc"
| 138 || September 1 || @ Blue Jays || 4–2 (11) || Hernandez (6–1) || Spoljaric || — || 30,156 || 74–64
|- bgcolor="ffbbbb"
| 139 || September 2 || Tigers || 6–8 || Myers || Hernandez (6–2) || Lima || 19,599 || 74–65
|- bgcolor="ccffcc"
| 140 || September 3 || Tigers || 6–4 || Bertotti (2–0) || Olivares || Hernandez (35) || 13,857 || 75–65
|- bgcolor="ccffcc"
| 141 || September 4 || Tigers || 11–6 || Castillo (1–0) || Miller || — || 15,120 || 76–65
|- bgcolor="ffbbbb"
| 142 || September 6 || Red Sox || 3–10 || Wakefield || Alvarez (15–8) || — || 18,417 || 76–66
|- bgcolor="ccffcc"
| 143 || September 7 || Red Sox || 4–3 || Fernandez (13–9) || Clemens || Hernandez (36) || 28,219 || 77–66
|- bgcolor="ccffcc"
| 144 || September 8 || Red Sox || 7–4 || Baldwin (11–4) || Sele || Hernandez (37) || 19,983 || 78–66
|- bgcolor="ffbbbb"
| 145 || September 10 || @ Orioles || 1–5 || Wells || Tapani (12–9) || — || 43,320 || 78–67
|- bgcolor="ffbbbb"
| 146 || September 11 || @ Orioles || 6–7 (10) || Mills || Hernandez (6–3) || — || 43,320 || 78–68
|- bgcolor="ccffcc"
| 147 || September 12 || @ Orioles || 11–3 || Fernandez (14–9) || Mussina || — || 47,342 || 79–68
|- bgcolor="ffbbbb"
| 148 || September 13 || @ Red Sox || 5–9 || Clemens || Baldwin (11–5) || Slocumb || 28,907 || 79–69
|- bgcolor="ccffcc"
| 149 || September 14 || @ Red Sox || 13–5 || Castillo (2–0) || Gordon || Simas (2) || 31,841 || 80–69
|- bgcolor="ffbbbb"
| 150 || September 15 || @ Red Sox || 8–9 || Slocumb || Hernandez (6–4) || — || 32,452 || 80–70
|- bgcolor="ffbbbb"
| 151 || September 16 || Indians || 3–4 || McDowell || Alvarez (15–9) || — || 25,392 || 80–71
|- bgcolor="ffbbbb"
| 152 || September 17 || Indians || 4–9 || Anderson || Fernandez (14–10) || Plunk || 18,763 || 80–72
|- bgcolor="ffbbbb"
| 153 || September 18 || Indians || 3–4 || Lopez || Baldwin (11–6) || Mesa || 20,289 || 80–73
|- bgcolor="ccffcc"
| 154 || September 19 || Twins || 8–3 || Sirotka (1–2) || Rodriguez || Castillo (1) || 14,253 || 81–73
|- bgcolor="ccffcc"
| 155 || September 20 || Twins || 7–3 || Tapani (13–9) || Robertson || — || 15,673 || 82–73
|- bgcolor="ffbbbb"
| 156 || September 21 || Twins || 3–4 || Radke || Alvarez (15–10) || Trombley || 18,866 || 82–74
|- bgcolor="ccffcc"
| 157 || September 22 || Twins || 5–1 || Fernandez (15–10) || Aldred || — || 20,111 || 83–74
|- bgcolor="ccffcc"
| 158 || September 24 || Royals || 3–2 || Castillo (3–0) || Belcher || — || 14,348 || 84–74
|- bgcolor="ffbbbb"
| 159 || September 25 || Royals || 2–8 || Appier || Tapani (13–10) || — || 15,911 || 84–75
|- bgcolor="ccffcc"
| 160 || September 27 || @ Twins || 4–2 || Fernandez (16–10) || Radke || Hernandez (38) || 13,058 || 85–75
|- bgcolor="ffbbbb"
| 161 || September 28 || @ Twins || 6–7 || Trombley || Castillo (3–1) || — || 34,008 || 85–76
|- bgcolor="ffbbbb"
| 162 || September 29 || @ Twins || 4–5 (10) || Guardado || Hernandez (6–5) || — || 13,306 || 85–77
|-

|-
| Legend:       = Win       = LossBold = White Sox team member

Detailed records

1996 Opening Day lineup 
 Tony Phillips, LF
 Ray Durham, 2B
 Frank Thomas, 1B
 Danny Tartabull, RF
 Lyle Mouton, DH
 Robin Ventura, 3B
 Ron Karkovice, C
 Darren Lewis, CF
 Ozzie Guillén, SS
 Alex Fernandez, P

Transactions 
 August 31, 1996: Marvin Freeman was selected off waivers by the Chicago White Sox from the Colorado Rockies.

Roster

Player stats

Batting 
Note: G = Games played; AB = At bats; R = Runs scored; H = Hits; 2B = Doubles; 3B = Triples; HR = Home runs; RBI = Runs batted in; BB = Base on balls; SO = Strikeouts; AVG = Batting average; SB = Stolen bases

Pitching 
Note: W = Wins; L = Losses; ERA = Earned run average; G = Games pitched; GS = Games started; SV = Saves; IP = Innings pitched; H = Hits allowed; R = Runs allowed; ER = Earned runs allowed; HR = Home runs allowed; BB = Walks allowed; K = Strikeouts

Farm system

References

External links 
 1996 Chicago White Sox at Baseball Reference

Chicago White Sox seasons
Chicago White Sox season
White